Saint Francis of Assisi (Spanish:San Francisco de Asís) is a 1944 Mexican historical drama film directed by Alberto Gout and starring José Luis Jiménez, Alicia de Phillips and Antonio Bravo. It portrays the life of the Italian Saint Francis of Assisi.

The film's sets were designed by the art director Manuel Fontanals.

Cast
 José Luis Jiménez 
 Alicia de Phillips 
 Antonio Bravo
 Carmen Molina 
 Crox Alvarado 
 Elena D'Orgaz 
 Luis Alcoriza 
 Arturo Soto Rangel 
 Agustín Sen 
 Elia Ortiz
 Roberto Cañedo
 Emilio Brillas
 Salvador Quiroz 
 Ángel T. Sala 
 Manuel Noriega 
 Conchita Gentil Arcos 
 Pepe Ruiz Vélez 
 Fernando Curiel 
 Francisco Pando 
 Manuel Pozos 
 Paco Martinez
 Humberto Rodríguez 
 María Gentil Arcos 
 Leonor de Martorel
 Ana Sáenz
 Carmen Cortés 
 José Arratia 
 Alberto A. Ferrer 
 Jorge Arriaga
 María Marcos

References

Bibliography 
 Daniel Biltereyst &  Daniela Treveri Gennari. Moralizing Cinema: Film, Catholicism, and Power. Routledge, 2014.

External links 
 

1944 films
1940s historical drama films
Mexican historical drama films
1940s Spanish-language films
Films directed by Alberto Gout
Films set in the 13th century
Films set in Italy
Mexican black-and-white films
1944 drama films
1940s Mexican films